The Gabonese Democratic Party (PDG) was a political party in Gabon.

History
The party was established in 1945 by Emile Issembe and Paul Gondjout.

In August 1953 it merged with the Gabonese Mixed Committee (CMG) to form the Gabonese Democratic Bloc (BDG).

References

Defunct political parties in Gabon
French Equatorial Africa
Political parties established in 1945
1945 establishments in Gabon
1953 disestablishments in Gabon
Political parties disestablished in 1953